The Kruševo Republic (Bulgarian and Macedonian: Крушевска Република, Kruševska Republika) was a short-lived political entity proclaimed in 1903 by rebels from the Secret Macedonian-Adrianople Revolutionary Organization (IMRO) in Kruševo during the anti-Ottoman  Ilinden–Preobrazhenie Uprising. According to subsequent Bulgarian and followed later Macedonian narratives, it was one of the first modern-day republics in the Balkans.

History 

On 3 August 1903, rebels captured the town of Kruševo in the Manastir Vilayet of the Ottoman Empire (present-day North Macedonia) and established a revolutionary government. The entity existed only for 10 days: from 3 to 13 August, and was headed by Nikola Karev. He was a strong leftist, rejecting the nationalism of the ethnic minorities and favouring alliances with ordinary Muslims against the Sultanate, as well as supporting the idea of a Balkan Federation.

Amongst the various ethnoreligious groups (millets) in Kruševo, a Republican Council was elected with 60 members – 20 representatives from three groups: Aromanians, Bulgarian Exarchists and Greek Patriarchists. The Council also elected an executive body—the Provisional Government—with six members (2 from each mentioned group), whose duty was to promote law and order and manage supplies, finances, and medical care. The presumable "Kruševo Manifesto" was published in the first days after the proclamation. Written by Nikola Kirov, it outlined the goals of the uprising, calling upon the Muslim population to join forces with the provisional government in the struggle against Ottoman tyranny, to attain freedom and independence. Both Nikola Kirov and Nikola Karev were members of the Bulgarian Workers' Social Democratic Party, from where they derived these leftist ideas.

However, an ethnic identification problem arose. Karev called all the members of the local Council "brother Bulgarians", while the IMRO insurgents flew Bulgarian flags, killed five Greek Patriarchists, accused of being Ottoman spies, and subsequently assaulted the local Turk and Albanian Muslims. As long as the town was controlled by the Bulgarian komitadjis, the Patriarchist majority was suspected and terrorized. Except for Exarchist Aromanians, who were Bulgarophiles, (as Pitu Guli and his family), most members of the other ethnoreligious communities dismissed the IMRO as pro-Bulgarian.

Initially surprised by the uprising, the Ottoman government took extraordinary military measures to suppress it. Pitu Guli's band (cheta) tried to defend the town from Ottoman troops coming from Bitola. The whole band and their leader (voivode) perished. After fierce battles near Mečkin Kamen, the Ottomans managed to destroy the Kruševo Republic, committing atrocities against the rebel forces and the local population. As a result of the gunnery, the town was set partially ablaze. After the plundering of the town by the Turkish troops and the Albanian bashi-bazouks, the Ottoman authorities circulated a declaration for the inhabitants of Kruševo to sign, stating that the Bulgarian komitadjis had committed the atrocities and looted the town. A few citizens did sign it under administrative pressure.

Celebration

The celebration of the events in Kruševo began during the First World War, when the area, then called Southern Serbia, was 
occupied by Bulgaria. Naum Tomalevski, who was appointed a mayor of Kruševo, organized the nationwide celebration of the 15th anniversary of the Ilinden uprising. On the place of the Battle of Mečkin Kamen, a monument and a memorial-fountain were built. After the war, they were destroyed by the Serbian authorities, which continued implementing a policy of forcible Serbianization. The tradition of celebrating these events was restored during World War II in the region when it was called already Vardarska Banovina and was officially annexed by Bulgaria.

Meanwhile, the newly organized pro-Yugoslav Macedonian communist partisans developed the idea of some kind of socialist continuity between their struggle and the struggle of the insurgents in Kruševo. Moreover, they exhorted the population to struggle for "free Macedonia" and against the "fascist Bulgarian occupiers". After the war, the story continued in the Socialist Republic of Macedonia, where the Kruševo Republic was included in its historical narrative. The new Communist authorities successfully wiped out the remaining Bulgarophile sentiments. As part of the efforts to prove the continuity of the new Macedonian nation and the former insurgents, they claimed the IMRO-activists had been consciously Macedonian in identity. The establishment of the short-lived entity is seen today in North Macedonia as a prelude to the independence of the modern Macedonian state.

The "Ilinden Uprising Museum" was founded in 1953 on the 50th anniversary of the Krusevo Republic. It was located in the empty house of the Tomalevski family, where the Republic was proclaimed, though the family had long since emigrated to Bulgaria. In 1974 an enormous monument was built on the hill above Kruševo, which marked the feat of the revolutionaries and the ASNOM. In the area, there is another monument called Mečkin Kamen.

Modern references 

Nikola Kirov's writings, which are among the most known primary sources on the rebellion, mention Bulgarians, Vlachs (Aromanians), and Greeks (sic: Grecomans), who participated in the events in Krushevo. Although post-World War II Yugoslav Communist historians objected to Kirov's classification of Krusevo's Slavic population as Bulgarian, they quickly adopted everything else in his narrative of the events in 1903 as definitive. However, during the Informbiro period, the name of insurgents leader Nikola Karev was scrapped from the Macedonian anthem, as he and his brothers were suspected of being bulgarophile elements. Some modern Macedonian historians such as Blaže Ristovski have recognized, that the entity, nowadays a symbol of the Macedonian statehood, was composed of people who identified themselves as "Greeks", "Vlachs" (Aromanians), and "Bulgarians". In the early 20th century, Kruševo was populated by a Slavic population, Aromanians and Orthodox Albanians with town inhabitants being ethnoreligiously split among various Ottoman millets, with Greek Patriarchists being the largest community, followed by Bulgarian Exarchists and the Ullah Millet for the Aromanians. According to the ethnographer Vasil Kanchov's statistics based on linguistic affinity, at that time the town's inhabitants counted: 4,950 Bulgarians, 4,000 Vlachs (Aromanians) and 400 Orthodox Albanians. When the anthropologist Keith Brown visited Kruševo on the eve of the 21st century, he discovered that the local Aromanian language still has no way to distinguish "Macedonian" and "Bulgarian", and uses the designation Vrgari, i.e. "Bulgarians", for both ethnic groups. This upsets the younger generations of Macedonians in the town, since being Bulgarian has remained a stigma since Yugoslav times.

Gallery

See also
Strandzha Commune
Ilinden (memorial)
Militsiya of the Kruševo Republic

References

Sources
 Силянов, Христо. Освободителните борби на Македония, т. I, София 1933, гл. VI.1 
 13-те дена на Крушевската република, Георги Томалевски 
 The Republic of Krushevo and the Ilinden uprising

 
States and territories established in 1903
States and territories disestablished in 1903
Conflicts in 1903
Former republics
Macedonia under the Ottoman Empire
Manastir vilayet
Ottoman Kruševo
Rebellions against the Ottoman Empire
Internal Macedonian Revolutionary Organization
Bulgarian rebellions
History of the Aromanians